NE4, or NE-4, or similar, may refer to:
 Chinatown MRT station, Singapore
 Nebraska's 4th congressional district
 Nebraska Highway 4
 New England Interstate Route 4, now U.S. Route 7
 NE4, a postcode district in Newcastle upon Tyne, England; see NE postcode area